Rodrigo de Villandrando (1588 – December 1622) was a court painter during the reign of Philip III of Spain. He worked in the tradition of Alonso Sánchez Coello and Juan Pantoja de la Cruz. His death opened the road to court for the young painter Diego Velázquez from Sevilla.

Works
In Prado:
 Felipe IV y el enano Soplillo
 Isabel de Francia, mujer de Felipe IV

External links
 At wga.hu

17th-century Spanish painters
Spanish male painters
1623 deaths
1588 births
Court painters